Exploration of the Valley of the Amazon is a two volume publication by two young USN lieutenants William Lewis Herndon (vol. 1) and Lardner A. Gibbon (vol. 2).  Herndon split the main party in two so that he and Gibbon could explore two different areas of the Valley of the Amazon.

The Expedition
In 1851 William Lewis Herndon was ordered to head an expedition exploring the Valley of the Amazon – a vast uncharted area. Departing Lima, Peru, 21 May 1851, Lieut. Herndon, Lieut. Lardner Gibbon, and a small party of six men pressed into the wild and treacherously beautiful jungles. They split up and took different routes to gather even more information on this vast area. After a journey of 4,366 miles, which took Herndon through wilderness from sea level to heights of 16,199 feet, Herndon reached the city of Pará, Brazil on 11 April 1852. On 26 January 1853 Herndon submitted an encyclopedic and profusely illustrated 414-page report to the Secretary of the Navy John P. Kennedy. The report was later published as Exploration of the Valley of the Amazon.

The two volumes, one written by Lieutenant Herndon and the other by Lieutenant Gibbon, were so unusual at that time and of such importance that in an unusual move, it was immediately ordered, "10,000 additional copies be printed for the use of the Senate." Three months later another 20,000 copies were ordered; the book became an international best-seller. 

Their orders were to report on all possible conditions in the Amazon region that they would each have to traverse alone from Lima, Peru on the Pacific coast to Para, Brazil, the mouth of the Amazon. The two volumes were published by presidential order.

Background documents
32D CONGRESS, }       SENATE       {EXECUTIVE
2d Session No. 36.

EXPLORATION OF THE VALLEY OF THE AMAZON,

MADE UNDER DIRECTION OF THE NAVY DEPARTMENT,

BY

WM. LEWIS HERNDON AND LARDNER GIBBON,
LIEUTENANTS UNITED STATES NAVY.

PART I.
BY LIEUT. HERNDON.

WASHINGTON:
ROBERT ARMSTRONG, PUBLIC PRINTER.
 
1853.

LETTER OF THE SECRETARY OF THE NAVY,

COMMUNICATING

A Report of an Exploration of the Valley of the Amazon
and its tributaries, made by Lieut. Herndon, in connection
with Lieut. Gibbon.

FEBRUARY 10, 1853. — Referred to the Committee on Naval Affairs and ordered to be printed.

MARCH 3, 1853. — ordered that 10,000 additional copies be printed for the use of the Senate.

To the Senate and House of Representatives.

I herewith transmit a communication from the Secretary of the Navy, accompanied by the first part of Lieut. Herndon's Report of the Exploration of the Valley of the Amazon and its tributaries, made by him, in connection with Lieut. Lardner Gibbon, under instructions from the Navy Department.

MILLARD FILLMORE. 
WASHINGTON, February 9, 1853.

NAVY DEPARTMENT, February, 1853.

To the President:

SIR, In compliance with the notice given in the annual report of this department to the President, and communicated to Congress at the opening of its present session, I have the honor herewith to submit the first part of the Report of Lieut. Herndon, of the Exploration of the Valley of the Amazon and its tributaries, made by him, in connection with Lieut. Lardner Gibbon, under instructions from this department, dated the 15th of February, 1851.

I am happy to be able to inform you that Lieut. Gibbon reached Pará on his homeward journey some weeks ago, and may very soon be expected to arrive in the United States. When he returns, Lieut. 
Herndon will have all the materials necessary to complete his report, and will devote himself to that labor with the same assiduity which has characterized his present work.

I would respectfully beg leave to suggest that, in submitting this report to the House of Representatives, it be accompanied with a request to that body, if it should think proper to direct the printing of this valuable document, that the order for that purpose may include all the remaining portions of the report which may hereafter be furnished; and that the order for printing shall include a suitable direction for the engraving and publication of the maps, charts, and sketches, which will be furnished as necessary illustrations of the subjects treated of in the report. 
	
I have the honor to be, with the highest consideration, your obedient servant,

JOHN P. KENNEDY.
 

WASHINGTON CITY, January 26, 1853.

To the Hon. JOHN P. KENNEDY, 
Secretary of the Navy.

SIR: I have the honor to submit part first of the Report of an Exploration of the Valley of the Amazon, made by me, with the assistance of Lieut. Lardner Gibbon, under instructions of the Navy Department, bearing date February 15, 1851.

The desire expressed by the department for an early report of my exploration of the Amazon, and the general interest manifested in the public mind with regard to the same, have induced me to lay before you at once as full an account of our proceedings as can be made before the return of my companion. The general map which accompanies the report is based upon maps published by the Society for the Diffusion of Useful Knowledge, but corrected and improved according to my own personal observations, and on information obtained by me whilst in that country.

The final report of the expedition will be submitted as soon after Lieut. Gibbon's return as practicable. I am in daily expectation of intelligence from him. At the latest accounts (26 July 1852) he was at Trinidad de Moxos, on the Mamoré, in the republic of Bolivia, making his preparations for the descent of the Madeira.

I have the honor to be, very respectfully, your obedient servant,

WM. LEWIS HERNDON,
 
LIEUT. U. S. NAVY.

See also
SS Central America

References
Exploration of the Valley of the Amazon vol.1 by Lt. William Lewis Herndon, USN. (Wikisource)
Exploration of the Valley of the Amazon vol.2 by Lt. Lardner Gibbon, USN. (Wikisource)
 Herndon, W. L., & Gibbon, L. (1854). Exploration of the Valley of the Amazon, made under the direction of the Navy Department. Washington: Robert Armstrong. (Robert Armstrong was the government printer.)

Exploration of South America
American travel books
1854 non-fiction books
Amazon basin
Books about South America